Gordon Ray Carey (January 7, 1932 – November 27, 2021) was an American civil rights worker and Freedom Rider.

Life 
Carey was born on January 7, 1932, in Grand Rapids, Michigan to Marguerite (Jellema) Carey and Howard Ray Carey. His mother was a homemaker and his father was a Methodist minister and pacifist active in the local chapter of the Congress of Racial Equality (CORE).

In 1953, Carey registered as a conscientious objector and was consequently arrested by the Federal Bureau of Investigation and charged with draft evasion. Sentenced to 3 years, he spent a year in a minimum-security prison outside Tucson, Arizona. Upon his release, he took courses at Pasadena City College.

As part of the Civil Rights movement, Carey participated in sit-ins at segregated lunch counters and ran workshops to train hundreds of other people in civil disobedience. Carey also helped conceive of the idea for Freedom Rides - groups of Black and white activists who rode together on interstate buses to draw attention to a landmark 1960 U.S. Supreme Court decision that barred segregation by race on all forms of public transportation.

In the 1970s, Carey played a role in ultimately unsuccessful attempt to create a racially integrated utopian community called "Soul City."

Personal life 
Carey married Betye Boyd in 1959. They had two children, Kristina and Anthony Carey. Carey and Boyd divorced and he married Karen Wilken in 1974. Wilken and Carey had a daughter, Ramona.

Carey died on November 27, 2021, in Arlington County, Virginia.

References

External links 

 

1932 births
2021 deaths
Freedom Riders
Activists from Michigan
People from Grand Rapids, Michigan
American conscientious objectors